Jupiters Darling is the thirteenth studio album by  American rock band Heart, released on June 22, 2004, by Sovereign Artists. Sovereign Artist's marketing director, Paul Angles, simultaneously released their album via file sharing networks, which were included in an amicus curiae brief to the US Supreme Court. Two promotional singles were released simultaneously with the album: "The Oldest Story in the World", which peaked at number 22 on Billboard Heritage Rock chart, and "The Perfect Goodbye". Heart performed "The Perfect Goodbye" with country singer Wynonna Judd on CMT Crossroads on July 9, 2004.

This album continued the move back to Heart's hard rock and folk rock roots. It peaked at number 94 on the US Billboard 200.

The album cover bears an image of the Mandelbrot set, rotated so the main cardioid is oriented the same way a heart would normally be, with the cusp at top. The album cover art is seen briefly in the 2005 film Elizabethtown, for which Nancy Wilson provided soundtrack music; at the time she was married to the film's director and screenwriter, Cameron Crowe.

Track listing

Notes
 Upon the album's initial release, an exclusive additional track, "Good Vibrations", was available for a limited time as a digital-only download.

Personnel
Credits adapted from the liner notes of Jupiters Darling.

Heart
 Ann Wilson – lead vocals, harmonies, spoken word
 Nancy Wilson – lead vocals ; harmonies, electric and acoustic guitars, mandolins, mandocello, dulcimer, blues harp, piano, megaphone, string arrangements
 Craig Bartock – lead guitar, acoustics, pump organ, EBow orchestra, Mellotron, marimba, harmonies, string arrangements
 Darian Sahanaja – keyboards, Stylophone
 Mike Inez – bass, tambourine
 Ben Smith – drums, cardboard boxes

Additional musicians
 Jami Sieber – cello
 Ravi Jakhotia – percussion
 Terry Davison – pedal steel guitar 
 Mike McCready – EBow guitar ; Leslie guitar ; lead guitars 
 Jerry Cantrell – guitar

Technical
 Nancy Wilson – production, mixing
 Craig Bartock – production, engineering, mixing
 Dave Dysart – engineering
 Patrick MacDougall – engineering, mixing
 Kam Dahlin – engineering
 Brian "Big Bass" Gardner – mastering at Bernie Grundman Mastering (Los Angeles)

Artwork
 Nancy Wilson – album design, snapshots
 Klaus Whitley – album design, graphic design, additional images, angel wings
 Randee St. Nicholas – photos
 Sabrina Voll – additional images 
 Patrick MacDougall – additional images 
 Thomas Day – fractal designs
 Theresa Day – fractal designs

Charts

References

2004 albums
Eagle Records albums
Heart (band) albums